Good Morning Australia (or GMA), also known as GMA with Bert Newton, originally titled The Morning Show, was an Australian breakfast television variety program on Network Ten hosted by Bert Newton between 20 January 1992 and 16 December 2005 featuring regular segments and celebrity guests

The program aired from 9:00am – 11:00am (9:00am – 11:30am for most of its run). The show was a lead in to the 11:30 News.

Program history 
Good Morning Australia (GMA) debuted on Network Ten on 20 January 1992 with the title The Morning Show, changing its name the following year from 1 February 1993 to Good Morning after the breakfast news program with the same name on the same network had previously aired between 1981 and December 1992.

Good Morning Australia itself replaced the long running Sydney based Til-Ten which was presented by Joan McInnes. GMA was Australia's first national morning talk program, unchallenged ratings wise until October 2002, until the Nine Network launched Mornings with Kerri-Anne.

For most of 1992, the program was produced in Melbourne from Ten's Nunawading Studios, from 1993 following the changing of the name to Good Morning Australia (aka GMA with Bert Newton),production of the show moved to level 4 at Network Ten's South Yarra studios.

The show featured numerous guests in each episode, often singers and actors. Regular segments included cooking, crafts, gardening, movie reviews and parenting. There was a segment called "In Bed with Bert", where four of his regulars answer questions that Newton reads. The questions were sent from viewers at home.

Often the off-camera crew acted as the studio audience. Starting in 2005 the public could view the taping on Fridays.

Bert Newton's sign off at the end of each program was: "We'll see you tomorrow [or ‘Monday’ on Friday's show] morning at 9:00".

Originally the program was live-to-air on Mondays and Tuesdays, and live-to-tape on Wednesday, Thursdays and Fridays. From mid-2004 onwards, the show became live-to-air five days a week to compete with Mornings with Kerri Anne.

In October 2005, Network Ten announced that GMA would be cancelled at the end of the year after a fourteen-year run. Following this announcement and after months of speculation, Bert Newton decided to leave Ten and return to the Nine Network.

The final live edition of Good Morning Australia aired Friday 16 December 2005, and included guest appearances by former GMA regular Susie Elelman and showbiz legend Maria Venuti. The following week, GMA switched to summer mode, with the summer show airing from 19 December 2005. The summer series of Good Morning Australia ended on 27 January 2006, a week before the premiere of 9am with David and Kim.

Musical direction

John Foreman was the program's musical director from the program's inception in 1992 for GMA until his retirement in 2004, when Mark Amato was appointed as his replacement for the final two years.

Musicians, entertainers and singers

Some of the musicians that have performed on the show include:

Regular segment contributors

The program had many regular contributors to various topical segments. Robert Mascara, the floor manager and assistant director for the programme's entire run, appeared as "Belvedere", the official food taste tester during the cooking segments.

Celebrity chefs

Cast Regulars

Shannon Watts joined GMA in May 2005 replacing Ed Phillips who went on to host Temptation for the Nine Network. Shannon was soon put out in the field hosting segments from the AFL Grand Final, the Australian Grand Prix and the Gold Coast Indy 300. Not long after, Shannon was appointed as an advertorial presenter on GMA. Shannon did over 160 episodes of Good Morning Australia.  Shannon stayed with GMA until the show's end and went on to be a reporter on the replacement show 9am with David & Kim.

Fill-in presenters
A number of people have filled in for Bert Newton as presenter over the years when he was either ill or on leave. The people that have filled in for him include:

Advertorials
The show featured a number of advertorial presenters

The advertorials were for products from various local and international direct selling companies Danoz Direct, Guthy Renker and Global Shop Direct.

Related shows

Prior to Newton's tenure as host of GMA Network Ten in Melbourne ran a similar program titled Good Morning Melbourne hosted by Roy Hampson and Annette Allison During Hampson's tenure. The program had a number of different titles, such as The Roy Hampson Show and Roundabout.

Seven Network program
The Morning Show (TV program)

Good Morning Australia's former title The Morning Show was adopted by a rival show on the Seven Network, presented by Larry Emdur and Kylie Gillies

Successor

Network Ten successor to GMA was 9am with David & Kim, hosted by musician  David Reyne and journalist/news anchor Kim Watkins, which had a similar format, however 9am was not filmed in front of the live studio audience.

See also

 List of longest-running Australian television series
 List of Australian television series
 9am with David & Kim
 Elizabeth Chong's Tiny Delights

References

External links 
 

1992 Australian television series debuts
2005 Australian television series endings
Australian variety television shows
English-language television shows
Network 10 original programming
Television shows set in Melbourne